Yanwath and Eamont Bridge is a civil parish in the Eden District of Cumbria, England, consisting of the small village of Yanwath and most of the neighbouring village of Eamont Bridge.  In the 2001 census it had a population of 457, increasing to 535 at the 2011 Census.

The parish was created in 1866 and was formerly a township of Barton.  The boundaries are now partially marked by the Rivers Eamont and Lowther.  The parish council meets at the village hall in Eamont Bridge.  The parish combines with Sockbridge and Tirril and Clifton to make up the Eamont ward of Eden District Council.

Half a mile north-west of Yanwath, Yanwath Hall is a fortified tower and hall house built in the early to mid 15th century, with 16th and 17th century alterations.

Governance
The civil parish falls in the electoral ward of Eamont. This ward stretches west to Sockbridge and Tirril with a total population of 1,447.

See also

Listed buildings in Yanwath and Eamont Bridge

References

External links
 Cumbria County History Trust: Yanwath and Eamont Bridge (nb: provisional research only – see Talk page)

Westmorland
Civil parishes in Cumbria